The Archie Teater Studio, also known as Teater's Knoll, is a Frank Lloyd Wright designed Usonian home and art studio that was commission in 1952 with construction in Bliss, Idaho completed in 1957. The client, Archie Boyd Teater, was an American landscape and genre artist. The Teater Studio uses Oakley Stone in both the exterior and interior of the building. Original construction was supervised by Edmond Thomas "Tom" Casey, an apprentice in Wright's Taliesin Fellowship. The home was added to the National Register of Historic Places in 1984.

Current occupants of the studio are Lynn Fawcett, who grew up in the Wright designed Randall Fawcett House, and her husband, Henry Whiting II (an architectural writer). The two consulted with Tom Casey in the restoration and expansion of the building. Their work began in the 1980s and was completed the next decade.

References

 Storrer, William Allin. The Frank Lloyd Wright Companion. University Of Chicago Press, 2006,  (S.352)
 Whiting, Henry II. At Nature's Edge: Frank Lloyd Wright's Artist Studio. University of Utah Press; 1st edition

External links
Teater Studio on waymarking.com
Teater's Knoll, Bliss
jetsetmodern.com:  Teaters Knoll, Frank Lloyd Wright, Henry Whiting II and Lynn Fawcett
Archie Boyd and Patricia Teater Studio-Residence, Bliss, Idaho (1952) (S.352)

Frank Lloyd Wright buildings
Houses on the National Register of Historic Places in Idaho
Houses in Gooding County, Idaho
Houses completed in 1952
National Register of Historic Places in Gooding County, Idaho